This was the first edition of the tournament. 

Frances Tiafoe won the title after defeating Noah Rubin 6–4, 6–2 in the final.

Seeds

Draw

Finals

Top half

Bottom half

References
Main Draw
Qualifying Draw

Stockton ATP Challenger - Singles